William Pigott Cronan (March 6, 1879 – March 18, 1929) was a United States Navy Captain who served as the 19th Naval Governor of Guam. During his tenure in the Navy, he became decorated, commanded a number of ships, and came to be known as "the most popular man in the Navy". He participated in the Battle of Santiago de Cuba during the Spanish–American War. In 1903, he gained some attention for his participation in the rescue of a Venezuelan fisherman off the coast of La Guaira under bad conditions. Both the Venezuelan government and navy command praised him for the way he carried out the operation. He became a national news story in 1907 while serving aboard  during a training operation. When a gun nearly exploded because of leaking powder; he shoved his hand into the gun's breechblock, preventing the explosion and losing two of his fingers in the process.

He would later command the Atlantic Fleet Torpedo Flotilla Fifth Fleet from the flagship . During World War I, he first commanded  and captured German Corvette Captain Adalbert Zuckschwerdt off the coast of Guam. He also commanded  during the war, for which he received the Navy Cross. The house he owned with wife Nellie Grant Cronan, granddaughter of President Ulysses S. Grant, is now an historical site in San Diego. He is buried at Arlington National Cemetery.

Life
Cronan was born on March 6, 1879, to Patrick J. Cronan and Ellen Theresa (Pigott) Cronan in New Haven, Connecticut. His uncle, James P. Pigott, served in the United States House of Representatives from Connecticut. Another uncle, James T. Mullen, was the first Supreme Knight of the Order of the Knights of Columbus.

Cronan was an officer in the New York Yacht Club. He married Nellie Grant, daughter of Jesse Root Grant and granddaughter of President Ulysses S. Grant, in 1913. They had two daughters: Nellie Grant Cronan and Elizabeth Grant Cronan. Nellie was born in Tokyo and married United States Army Captain Franklin Gibney Rothwell in 1942. From 1923 until his death in 1929 Cronan lived in San Diego, California, in the William and Nell Cronan House, now considered an historical resource by the city. During his time in the Navy, he was known as "the most popular man in the Navy". He is buried at Arlington National Cemetery.

Naval career
Cronan graduated from the United States Naval Academy in 1898. While still a naval cadet he served aboard . Upon graduation, he participated in the Battle of Santiago de Cuba of the Spanish–American War aboard . He also served aboard  as an ensign. He subsequently served aboard , leaving the ship in 1901. In 1903, while serving aboard , Cronan and eight enlisted men rescued a Venezuelan fisherman off the coast of La Guaira under dangerous conditions, for which he received praise from the Venezuelan government and his superior officers.  He also served with the Judge Advocate General's Corps, U.S. Navy.

In 1907, he gained some fame for an incident aboard  during a target practice exercise. Believing an explosion imminent within the breechblock of one of the ship's guns, Cronan shoved his hand within the block to prevent its closing. He prevented any explosion and lost two fingers of his right hand in the process.

During his time in command, the ship struck a naval pier at full speed and took several hours to get loose. In 1913 he became the commander of the newly formed Atlantic Fleet Torpedo Flotilla Fifth Fleet and also commanded his flagship . He retired as a Captain on October 4, 1923.

Governorship
Cronan served as acting Naval Governor of Guam from April 29, 1916, to May 8, 1916. As the ranking officer present, he took command from outgoing governor William John Maxwell pending the arrival of appointee Roy Campbell Smith. He captured German Corvette Captain Adalbert Zuckschwerdt after the German officer exploded  rather than allow her to be captured in Apra Harbor during World War I. He reportedly greeted Zuckschwerdt with the accolade "Sir, you are a brave man."

References

External links

Arlington National Cemetery

United States Naval Academy alumni
Governors of Guam
1879 births
1929 deaths
Military personnel from New Haven, Connecticut
Members of the New York Yacht Club
People from San Diego
Burials at Arlington National Cemetery
American military personnel of the Spanish–American War
United States Navy personnel of World War I
United States Navy Judge Advocate General's Corps
American amputees
Recipients of the Navy Cross (United States)
Military personnel from California